Reign is the third studio album by Ghanaian artist Shatta Wale, released on October 13, 2018 by Zylofon Music and Shatta Movement Empire.

Background
Prior to the release of Reign, Wale embarked on a media tour to promote its launch. During one of his interviews, Wale made comments which rapper Sarkodie did not like, so Sarkodie released the diss track "Advice" directed at Wale as a result. The diss track generated heated debate, with some pundits predicting it would have a negative impact on the album launch, but the launch at the Fantasy Dome in Accra was considered successful, with thousands of fans attending. Some also criticized the diss track as an attempt to dampen the praise Reign was receiving.

Commercial performance
Reign debuted at number 6 on the Billboard Top World Albums Chart.

Track listing

References

2018 albums
Shatta Wale albums